Hualapai Peak is a  mountain summit in Mohave County, Arizona and is the highest point of the Hualapai Mountains.

The mountain is characterized by huge granite outcroppings and pillars, a result of its volcanic origin. Although trails lead to its base, a moderate scramble and climb is required to reach the summit.

There are also climbing routes along the trail to the peak.

It is named after the Hualapai Native American tribe. Hualapai means "people of the tall pines".

See also

 List of mountain peaks of Arizona

References

Mountains of Arizona
Landforms of Mohave County, Arizona
North American 2000 m summits